Stenoptilodes gilvicolor is a moth of the family Pterophoridae that is known from Chile and Colombia.

Adults are on wing in March.

External links

gilvicolor
Moths described in 1877
Moths of South America